Surp Asdvadzadzin Patriarchal Church, also known as the Holy Mother of God Patriarchal Church, is an Armenian Apostolic church located in Kumkapı quarter of Fatih district in old Istanbul, Turkey. It is the church of the Armenian Patriarchate of Constantinople, which has its offices directly across the church in the same street.

See also
Armenians in Turkey

References

Armenian Apostolic churches in Istanbul
Fatih
Armenian buildings in Turkey